Archis is a village in the Noyemberyan Municipality of the Tavush Province of Armenia.

Gallery

References

External links 

World Gazeteer: Armenia – World-Gazetteer.com

Populated places in Tavush Province